Governor Willis may refer to:

Frank B. Willis, 47th Governor of Ohio
Simeon Willis, 46th Governor of Kentucky